The Sea of Ice, (German: Das Eismeer) (1823–1824), is an oil painting that depicts a shipwreck in the Arctic by the German Romantic painter Caspar David Friedrich. Before 1826 this painting was known as The Polar Sea.

The work was first exhibited at the Prague Academy exhibition in 1824 with the title An Idealized Scene of an Arctic Sea, with a Wrecked Ship on the Heaped Masses of Ice. Considered one of Friedrich's masterpieces, the radical composition and subject matter were unusual for their time and the work was met with incomprehension. The painting was still unsold when Friedrich died in 1840. It is currently held by the Kunsthalle Hamburg, Germany.

Background on Friedrich 
Caspar David Friedrich was born on September 5, 1774 in Greifswald, Germany. He grew up a Protestant. Friedrich began studying art with a drawing teacher from the University of Greifswald named Johann Gottfried Quistorp. He went on to study at the Akademi for de Skønne Kunster in Copenhagen, Denmark from 1794–1798. After this Friedrich studied at the Hochschule der Bildenen Künste in Dresden, Germany.  Friedrich decided to live the rest of his life in Dresden where he died on May 7, 1840.

Romanticism 
The Romantic movement emerged at the end of the eighteenth century. Romanticism was both an artistic movement and an approach to life. It rejected the Enlightenment ideas of rationalism and intellect in favor of religion, emotion, and culture. A major theme in Romanticism is the focus on nature as the subject.

In the 19th century many Germans were interested in the Arctic including Friedrich. In German Romanticism the North was seen as a positive thing while the classic south was a negative thing.

Friedrich and Romanticism 
Like many other painters in the 19th century, Friedrich decided to focus on landscapes as the main subjects of his paintings. Friedrich's style is considered to fit under the category of Romanticism because of his paintings of nature. His goal was to create on the canvas the images in his mind. Through his paintings, Friedrich attempted to show the spiritual and religious meaning of nature. Friedrich is famous for creating spiritual meaning in many of his paintings.

History
The collector Johann Gottlob von Quandt commissioned two pictures that were to symbolize the south and the north. Johann Martin von Rohden received the commission to paint Southern Nature in her Abundant and Majestic Splendor, while the commission for Northern Nature in the whole of her Terrifying Beauty fell to Friedrich. However, as Vasily Zhukovsky in a letter dated 1821 reported, Friedrich –

Accounts of expeditions to the North Pole were occasionally published during those years which is likely how Friedrich became familiar with William Edward Parry's 1819–1820 expedition to find the Northwest Passage. In the winter of 1820–21, Friedrich made extensive oil studies of ice floes on the river Elbe, near Dresden. These were probably incorporated into The Sea of Ice.

The image created a lasting impression on the French sculptor David d'Angers during his visit to Dresden in 1834, which he described as follows:

The painting has been known by several different names. In the catalogue of Friedrich's estate compiled following his death, it was called Ice Picture. The Disaster-stricken North Pole Expedition.

Description 
The Sea of Ice was composed in one of Friedrich's studios near Dresden. This painting is clearly based on the Arctic, though Friedrich had never visited the Arctic. It has been suggested that Friedrich gained his knowledge about the Arctic from the William Edward Parry's expedition. But because there were multiple reports and articles about the Arctic in Germany it has never been confirmed that Friedrich used Parry's expedition to paint The Sea of Ice. Friedrich also gained knowledge about icebergs through studying them on the Elbe.

The Sea of Ice represents what Friedrich believes the Arctic looks like. In the foreground of the painting there are small icebergs layered on top of each other, which makes them almost look like steps. In the background, however, the icebergs are crushed together to form a tower of ice. These icebergs are very large and suggest something terrible has happened. Right next to this massive ice tower is a minuscule detail that is not the subject of the painting. It is a shipwreck.

Analysis 
The shipwreck in The Sea of Ice suggests the idea that nature will always be superior to men. Ice is a place of death and nature will always defeat anyone who tries to intrude on it.

As a child, Friedrich suffered a traumatic experience which involved his brother, Johann Christoffer, who on the 8th of December, 1787 fell through the ice on a body of water and died. It has been rumored that Friedrich might have forced his brother to go onto the ice. Some scholars have speculated that Friedrich's experience could have influenced this painting.

There is a theory that Friedrich painted this piece as a commentary on Germany. Just as the ship is frozen in ice, Germany is considered to be a frozen wasteland politically with no hope for improvement.

The work may have been inspired by Théodore Géricault's The Raft of the Medusa (1818–19). Friedrich's work shares with Géricault's a similar compositional framework and bleak metaphorical outlook in relation to the unforgiving sea. The tragedy represented in The Medusa is a human responsibility irrespective of the surroundings, while The Sea of Ice presents a more pessimistic message, with the tragedy a result of mankind's hubris in its attempts to master nature.

Sublime 
The theory of the sublime combines the emotion of horror and pleasure. The main theorists of the sublime are Edmund Burke, Immanuel Kant, and Friedrich Schiller. Nature has always been associated with the idea of the sublime. Towards the end of the 18th century, paintings of the Arctic were associated with the sublime. There has, however, been debate about whether or not the painting The Sea of Ice belongs to the category of the sublime. The shards of ice may convey danger, but they can also be seen as beautiful. One reason why there has been debate about whether or not this painting fits the sublime is that it is not clear if the viewer can actually be a part of the painting, which is a major element of the sublime.

Influence

The painting has been hailed by critic Russell Potter as a key instance of the "Arctic Sublime", and an influence on later nineteenth-century polar paintings.

The painting inspired Paul Nash's 1941 work Totes Meer (Dead Sea). It also proved influential upon the arctic landscapes of Lawren Harris.

Architect Thom Mayne references The Sea of Ice as a primary influence on his approach to the dynamic relationship between architecture, landscape, and nature. It possibly served as an inspiration for the Sydney Opera House.

The outdoor, free-floating sculpture "She Lies" by Monica Bonvicini is a three-dimensional interpretation of the original Friedrich painting installed in the Oslo fjord next to the Oslo Opera House. The sculpture opened in May 2010 and has become one of the tourist attractions in downtown Oslo.

See also
List of works by Caspar David Friedrich

Notes

References

External links

Paintings by Caspar David Friedrich
1820s paintings
Maritime paintings
Paintings in the Hamburger Kunsthalle